Trevor Taylor may refer to:

 Trevor Taylor (racing driver) (1936–2010), British motor racing driver
 Trevor Taylor (politician), Canadian politician
 Trevor Taylor (singer) (1958–2008), Jamaican-German singer, musician, music producer, and songwriter
 Trevor Taylor (table tennis), English table tennis player